West Maas en Waal is a municipality in the Dutch province of Gelderland.

Population centres

Topography

Dutch Topographic map of the municipality of West Maas en Waal, 2013.

Demographics
 Dutch: 93.6% 
 Black people: 0.4%
 European: 4.7
 Arabs: 0.4%
 Other non-Western: 0.9%:

Notable people 

 Samuel Story (1752 in Maasbommel – 1811) vice admiral of the Batavian Republic Navy
 Jona Lendering (born 1964 in Beneden-Leeuwen) historian and the author of books on antiquity, Dutch history and modern management
 Marco Pastors (born 1965 in Beneden-Leeuwen) civil servant and former politician
 Iris van Herpen (born 1984 in Wamel) fashion designer, known for fusing technology with traditional Couture craftsmanship

Sport 
 Jan van Deinsen (born 1953) a retired football midfielder, 276 caps
 Ivo den Bieman (born 1967 in Wamel) retired footballer, played mainly in Scotland with about 260 caps
 Arno van Zwam (born 1969 in Beneden-Leeuwen) former football goalkeeper, over 300 caps

Gallery

References

External links

Official website

 
Municipalities of Gelderland